Alldays & Onions was an English engineering business and an early automobile manufacturer based at Great Western Works and Matchless Works, Small Heath, Birmingham. It manufactured cars from 1898 to 1918. The cars were sold under the Alldays & Onions name. Alldays also built an early British built tractor, the Alldays General Purpose Tractor. After the First World War the cars were sold under the name Enfield Alldays. Car production seems to have ceased in the 1920s but the manufacture of many other items continued. The company became part of the Mitchell Cotts Group.

History

Engineering businesses: Onions (formed by John Onions in 1650) and William Allday & Co. (formed by William Allday in 1720) joined in 1889 under the ownership of Alldays & Onions Pneumatic Engineering Company Limited. They made engineering and blacksmithing equipment. Like many such companies at the time they turned to bicycle manufacture and sold a range under the Alldays name. They also started making motorcycles in 1903 under the Alldays-Matchless name; these had no connection with the London-based Matchless company, and in 1915 presumably following representations from them, the name was changed to Allon. Manufacture of these continued until 1927.

Alldays and Onions produced its first car in 1898. The Traveller, a quadricycle made in private and commercial forms, was steered by a wheel. It had an unsprung rear end, power generated by a 4 hp De Dion single-cylinder motor.  However, series production did not start until 1903/4 with the 7 hp model. Larger commercial vehicles of up to 5 tons were also made in the years preceding the first World War and saw service during the conflict.

Alldays hit commercial success with the 1.6-litre, vertical-twin side-valve 10/12, which was made from 1905 to 1913. It was popular with commercial drivers and did well in period formula events and hill-climbs. A 16 hp 4-cylinder joined the lineup in 1906, and in 1908, the Enfield Autocar Co. was acquired. Shortly afterward, the range was rationalized, with most models being sold under both brand-names. The Alldays contribution to the equation was the well-established twin- and four-cylinders that put out 14 and 20 hp, always shaft-driven. A 30/35 hp six-cylinder was listed from 1911 to 1914, compressed-air starters being optional in 1911. In 1913, the 990 cc V-twin Midget cyclecar was introduced, featuring air cooling and shaft drive, selling at £138.10s. (About £ today). An 1100 cc 4-cylinder version with a bullnose radiator appeared in 1914, popular at the price of £175. (About £ today). Pair-cast side-valve four-cylinders rated at 12/14, 16/20, and 25/30 hp filled out the immediate pre-war offerings. 

Alldays & Onions had merged in 1908 with the short lived Enfield Autocar Company which had been formed to take over the car making interests of the Enfield Cycle Company. They produced cars called Enfield-Allday until 1925.

Alldays and Onions also manufactured railway inspection cars for the Great Eastern and London, Brighton and South Costs Railways.  At least one of these found its way to Australia for use on the Wolgan Valley Railway. Another was built in 1906 for the extensive three foot gauge system of the County Donegal Railways in Ireland. It later went into passenger service and became their Railcar Number 1. Although small, its success led to larger vehicles being built and contributed to the introduction of internal combustion railcars and multiple units across Ireland.  It is preserved at the Ulster Folk and Transport Museum.

Product range
On flotation as a public company in 1916 the following products were manufactured: motor lorries, cars and vans, cycles and motor cycles, complete outfits for foundries, engineers' and railway workshops, pneumatic power hammers, drop and lifting stamps, oil, gas and fuel furnaces, hardening shop equipment, Roots blowers, blacksmiths' shops, exhaust and blowing fans, smiths' hearths, portable forges, anvils and vises, cranes, pulley blocks, bellows, etc.

Main Car Models

Tractor Models

 The Alldays General Purpose Tractor - only a couple of examples survive in the UK of this early internal-combustion-engined model. The tractor had advanced features such as sprung axles, enclosed engine and a basic canopy for the operator.

See also
 List of British cars
 List of former tractor manufacturers
 List of car manufacturers of the United Kingdom

References

Michael Sedgwick, "Alldays", in G.N. Georgano, ed., The Complete Encyclopedia of Motorcars 1885-1968  (New York: E.P. Dutton and Co., 1974), pp. 35–6.
Norman Painting, "Alldays & Onions" .

External links
 Alldays & Onions 12-14 tourer 1914
 http://www.gracesguide.co.uk/Alldays_and_Onions

Veteran vehicles
Vintage vehicles
Cyclecars
Defunct motor vehicle manufacturers of England
Defunct companies based in Birmingham, West Midlands
Tractor manufacturers of the United Kingdom